Pleasanton Ridge Regional Park is a  park in the East Bay Regional Park District overlooking Pleasanton, California and the Livermore Valley to the east. The park is scheduled to grow by almost  (sic) with the acquisition of the Tyler Ranch.

History
Pleasanton Ridge Regional Park, located west of the I-680 freeway and the City of Pleasanton, California, became a reality in 1988, when the East Bay Regional Park District bought  to start what would become its second-largest park. In 1980, a real estate developer had proposed building a golf course and a number of new homes atop Pleasanton Ridge. A large number of area residents opposed the proposal and defeated it in a referendum in 1983.

In 2012, the park district announced it had purchased  from Robertson Ranch, east of Palomares Road, which it would add to Pleasanton Ridge Regional Park. The tract included the landmark Sunol Peak (elevation . The price was reported as $6.2 million.  The report stated that prior to the purchase, the regional park contained  of land.

Tyler Ranch acquisition
The Tyler Ranch extends for about  along Sunol Ridge.  The north end of the ranch abutted the existing Pleasanton Ridge park at the end of Kilkare Road. It also has good access from Foothill Road. The acquisition was supported by the Priem Family Foundation, which is dedicated to preserving open space in the greater Bay Area.

EBRPD claimed that the Tyler Ranch acquisition marked the occasion when the district acquired 100,000 acres since it was formed in 1934.

Trails

Adjacent to the park is the Augustin Bernal Park.

Notes

References

External links
East Bay Regional Parks: official Pleasanton Ridge Regional Park website

East Bay Regional Park District
Parks in Alameda County, California
Geography of Pleasanton, California
Amador Valley